Daniel Francisco Duarte (born December 4, 1996) is a Mexican professional baseball relief pitcher in the Cincinnati Reds organization. He was signed by the Texas Rangers as an international free agent in 2013. He made his Major League Baseball (MLB) debut in 2022 for the Reds.

Career

Texas Rangers
On July 2, 2013, Duarte was signed by the Texas Rangers organization as an international free agent. He made his professional debut with the AZL Rangers in 2015, posting a 5.68 ERA in 4 games. In 2016, Duarte pitched in 12 games for the Dominican Summer League Rangers, recording a 6–3 record and 3.05 ERA with 44 strikeouts in 59.0 innings pitched. On April 18, 2017, Duarte was loaned to the Tigres de Quintana Roo of the Mexican League for the 2017 season. In 37 appearances for Quintana Roo, Duarte logged a 6–1 record and 1.96 ERA.

Kansas City Royals
On December 12, 2017, Duarte was selected by the Kansas City Royals in the minor league phase of the Rule 5 draft. Duarte was loaned to the Tigres de Quintana Roo of the Mexican League from March 30 to June 30, 2018, and posted a 2–1 record and 4.26 ERA in 21 appearances. He split the remainder of the season between the rookie-level Idaho Falls Chukars and the Single-A Lexington Legends, recording a cumulative 1.05 ERA in 13 appearances. For the 2019 season, Duarte split the year between the rookie-level AZL Royals, Lexington, and the High-A Wilmington Blue Rocks, pitching to a 5.60 ERA with 26 strikeouts in 27.1 innings pitched. On October 19, 2019, Duarte was released by the Royals organization.

Cincinnati Reds
On January 28, 2020, Duarte signed with the Tigres de Quintana Roo of the Mexican League. However, he was released on February 7 so he could pursue an opportunity with an MLB team. On February 8, 2020, Duarte signed a minor league contract with the Cincinnati Reds organization. Duarte did not play in a game in 2020 due to the cancellation of the minor league season because of the COVID-19 pandemic. He was released by the Reds organization on June 1.

Acereros de Monclova
On May 20, 2021, Duarte signed with the Acereros de Monclova of the Mexican League. Duarte recorded an 0.64 ERA in 13 appearances for Monclova before being released on June 23 so he could sign with an MLB organization.

Cincinnati Reds (second stint)
On June 24, 2021, Duarte signed a minor league deal with the Cincinnati Reds organization. Duarte played in four different levels in for the Reds organization in 2021: the rookie-level ACL Reds, the High-A Dayton Dragons, the Double-A Chattanooga Lookouts, and the Triple-A Louisville Bats. Between the four teams, Duarte pitched to a 4.56 ERA with 32 strikeouts in 23.2 innings of work across 19 total appearances. He was selected to the 40-man roster following the season on November 19, 2021. 

Duarte made his major league debut on April 8, 2022. He made 3 appearances out of Cincinnati's bullpen before he was placed on the injured list on April 17 with right elbow inflammation. He was later transferred to the 60-day IL on April 23. On November 18, 2022, Duarte was non-tendered and became a free agent. On November 22, Duarte re-signed with the Reds on a minor league contract.

International career
Duarte was selected to the Mexico national baseball team at the 2020 Summer Olympics (contested in 2021).

References

External links

1996 births
Living people
Cincinnati Reds players
Mexican expatriate baseball players in the United States
Arizona League Rangers players
Dominican Summer League Rangers players
Mexican expatriate baseball players in the Dominican Republic
Tigres de Quintana Roo players
Yaquis de Obregón players
Idaho Falls Chukars players
Lexington Legends players
Cañeros de Los Mochis players
Arizona League Royals players
Wilmington Blue Rocks players
Arizona League Reds players
Dayton Dragons players
Acereros de Monclova players
Baseball players from Sonora
People from Huatabampo
Major League Baseball pitchers
Baseball players at the 2020 Summer Olympics
Olympic baseball players of Mexico
Louisville Bats players
Chattanooga Lookouts players
Arizona Complex League Reds players
Major League Baseball players from Mexico